Riverview, Virginia may refer to:

Riverview, Wise County, Virginia
Riverview, Norfolk, Virginia, a neighborhood of Norfolk
Riverview (Norfolk, Virginia), listed on the NRHP in Virginia
Riverview (Port Royal, Virginia), listed on the NRHP in Virginia
Riverview (Williamsburg, Virginia), listed on the NRHP in Virginia

See also 
Riverview Landing, Virginia, an unincorporated community in King William County, Virginia
Riverview Farm Park, a municipal park located in Newport News, Virginia